Gaudentius was a Greek music theorist in Classical Antiquity. Nothing is known of his life or background, or when he lived, except what can be inferred from his sole surviving work,  (English: Harmonic Introduction), a treatise.

Leonhard Schmitz and Karl von Jan say that he seems to have known the writings of Aristoxenus; but Schmitz says, not those of Ptolemy. Hugo Riemann says he may have been a younger contemporary of Ptolemy.

Cassiodorus praises the treatise, and mentions a contemporary Latin translation for use in schools by one Mutianus, which has not survived. The treatise was first printed in 1652 by Marcus Meibomius, together with a commentary and a Latin translation, in his Antiquae musicae auctores septem (English: Ancient Music by Seven Authors).

References

Further reading

External links

Date of birth unknown
Place of birth unknown
Date of death unknown
Place of death unknown
Ancient Greek music theorists